Masters of the Universe is a 1977 compilation album by Hawkwind covering the years 1971 to 1974 while the group were contracted to United Artists Records. It is the group's second compilation album, after the previous year's Roadhawks, and was compiled and released without the band's input or approval.

Track listing

Side one 
 "Master of the Universe" (Nik Turner, Dave Brock) – 6:19 – from In Search of Space (1971)
 "Brainstorm" (Turner) – 10:44 – from Doremi Fasol Latido (1972)

Side two 
 "Sonic Attack" (Michael Moorcock) – 2:59 – from A Space Ritual Alive (1973)
 "Orgone Accumulator" (Robert Calvert, Brock) – 10:00 – from A Space Ritual Alive (1973)
 "It's So Easy" (Brock) – 5:21 – B-side of "The Psychedelic Warlords (Disappear in Smoke)" single 
 "Lost Johnny" (Ian Kilmister, Mick Farren) – 3:28 – from Hall of the Mountain Grill (1974)

Personnel 
 Robert Calvert – vocals (tracks 3 and 4) 
 Dave Brock – vocals (track 5), guitar
 Del Dettmar – synthesizer, keyboards
 DikMik – audio generator (except 5 and 6)
 Nik Turner – vocals (tracks 1 and 2), flute, saxophone
 Dave Anderson – bass (track 1)
 Lemmy Kilmister – bass (except track 1), guitar and vocals (track 6)
 Terry Ollis – drums (track 1)
 Simon King – drums (except track 1)
 Simon House – synthesizer, violin, keyboards (tracks 5 and 6)

Release history 
 Feb 1977: United Artists, UAG 30025
 May 1982: EMI Fame, FA3008
 Aug 1987: Liberty, EMS1258
 May 1989: EMI Fame, FA3220, CD

References

External links 
 

Hawkwind compilation albums
1977 compilation albums
Albums produced by George Chkiantz
EMI Records compilation albums